Adrian John Dorber (born 23 September 1952) is a British Anglican priest. Since 2005, he has been the Dean of Lichfield Cathedral in the Church of England.

Early life and education
Dorber was born on 23 September 1952. He was educated at St John's College, Durham (BA, 1974) and King's College London (MTh, 1991).

Ordained ministry
Dorber was ordained in the Church of England as a deacon in 1979 and as a priest in 1980. His first post was a curacy at St Michael and St Mary Magdalene's Church in Easthampstead, Berkshire after which he was Priest in charge at St Barnabas, Emmer Green. From 1985 to 1997 he was Chaplain of Portsmouth Polytechnic then, when its status changed, Portsmouth University.  He was Director of Ministries and Training in the Diocese of Durham before his elevation to the Deanery as Dean of Lichfield on 24 September 2005. Dorber's retirement has been announced, effective 31 March 2023.

References

1952 births
Alumni of King's College London
People associated with the University of Portsmouth
Deans of Lichfield
Living people
Alumni of St John's College, Durham